The 2016 PowerShares QQQ 300 was the 1st stock car race of the 2016 NASCAR Xfinity Series season and the 35th iteration of the event. The race was held on Saturday, February 20, 2016, in Daytona Beach, Florida, at Daytona International Speedway a 2.5 miles (4.02 km) permanent triangular-shaped superspeedway. The race took the scheduled 120 laps to complete. At race's end, Chase Elliott, driving for JR Motorsports, held off a hard-charging Joey Logano to earn his 5th career NASCAR Xfinity Series win and his first of the season. To fill out the podium, Logano of Team Penske and Kasey Kahne of JR Motorsports would finish second and third, respectively.

Background 

Daytona International Speedway is one of three superspeedways to hold NASCAR races, the other two being Indianapolis Motor Speedway and Talladega Superspeedway. The standard track at Daytona International Speedway is a four-turn superspeedway that is 2.5 miles (4.0 km) long. The track's turns are banked at 31 degrees, while the front stretch, the location of the finish line, is banked at 18 degrees.

Entry list 

 (R) denotes rookie driver.
 (i) denotes driver who is ineligible for series driver points.

Practice

First practice 
The first practice session was held on Friday, February 19 at 11:00 AM EST.

Second practice 
The second practice session was held on Friday, February 19 at 1:00 PM EST.

Third and final practice 
The final practice session, sometimes referred to as Happy Hour, was held on Friday, July 14, at 3:00 PM EST.

Qualifying 
Qualifying was held on Saturday, February 20, at 11:00 AM EST. Since Daytona International Speedway is at least , the qualifying system was a single car, single lap, two round system where in the first round, everyone would set a time to determine positions 13-40. Then, the fastest 12 qualifiers would move on to the second round to determine positions 1-12.

Mark Thompson, Mario Gosselin, Harrison Rhodes, Derrike Cope, Chris Fontaine, Derek White, Mike Harmon, and Stanton Barrett failed to qualify.

Full qualifying results

Race results 
 Laps: 120

Standings after the race 

Drivers' Championship standings

Note: Only the first 12 positions are included for the driver standings.

References 

2016 NASCAR Xfinity Series
NASCAR races at Daytona International Speedway
February 2016 sports events in the United States
2016 in sports in Florida